Bundi State was an India princely state, located in modern-day Rajasthan. It was ruled by Hada Chauhans.  

It was a princely state in the era of British India. The last ruler of Bundi State signed the accession to join the Indian Union in 1949.

History

Medieval era
Later the region was governed by Rao Deva, who took over Bundi in 1242, renaming the surrounding area as Haravati or Haroti. For the next two centuries, the Hadas of Bundi were the vassals of the Sisodias of Mewar and ruled by the title of Rao until 1569, when Emperor Akbar conferred the title of Rao Raja upon Rao Surjan Singh after the surrender of Ranthambore Fort and his submission. In 1632, Rao Raja Chattar Sal became the ruler, he built the temple of Keshavarao at Keshoraipatan and Chathra Mahal at Bundi. He became king of Bundi after his grandfather Rao Ratan Singh, as his father Gopinath  died while Ratan Singh was still ruling. He saw service with the Mughal forces as head of his Hada Chauhan Rajput troop and was considered an integral part of Mughal army by Shahjahan. Rao Chattar Sal was trusted by Dara Shikoh with governorship of Delhi, a rare privilege for a Hindu. He remained loyal to Shah Jahan and Dara Shikoh during the rebellion of Aurangzeb despite many temptations and even threats from Aurangzeb. Rao Chattar Sal died fighting valiantly as the head of his Hada Rajput troops in the Battle of Samugarh in 1658 along with his youngest son Bharat Singh. Rao Bhao Singh (1658–1678) the eldest son of Chhattar Sal succeeded his father to the throne of Bundi. In 1707, Bahadur Shah I conferred the title of Maharao Raja upon Raja Budh Singh.

British era

In 1804 Rao Raja Bishan Singh (1773–1821) gave valuable assistance to Colonel Monson in his disastrous retreat before Holkar, in revenge for which the Maratha Empire and Pindaris continually ravaged his state and forced the kingdom to pay tribute up to 1817.  Consequently, Bishan Singh made a subsidiary alliance with the British East India Company on 10 February 1818, which brought him under its protection.  was responsible for the creation of the pleasure palace of Sukh Niwas on the outskirts of Bundi.

Maharao Raja Ram Singh (1821–89) grew up to be a much-respected ruler who initiated economic and administrative reforms and established schools for the teaching of Sanskrit. On the throne for 68 years, he was described as a grand specimen of the Rajput gentleman and "the most conservative prince in conservative Rajputana." His rule was popular and beneficial; and though during the mutiny of 1857 his attitude was equivocal, he continued to enjoy the confidence of the British, being created G.C.S.I. and a counselor of the empire in 1877 and C.I.E. in 1878. He was succeeded by his adopted son Raghubir Singh (1889–1927), who was made a K.C.S.I. in 1897 and a G.C.I.E. in 1901. His reign was blighted by two disastrous famines.  Despite his best efforts at alleviation, the population of his kingdom was reduced from some 258,000 to 171,000 by 1901 due to death and emigration.

Maharao Bahadur Singh (1945–77) also supported the British and served in the Burma campaign, where he earned the Military Cross for his gallantry before succeeding to the throne. He was a guest at 1947 wedding of Princess Elizabeth and Philip, Duke of Edinburgh.

Accession to India
At the time of the partition of India in 1947, the British abandoned their suzerainty over the princely states, which were left to decide whether to remain independent or to accede to the newly independent Dominion of India or to Pakistan. The ruler of the state of Bundi decided to accede to India, which later became the Union of India. This brought the internal affairs of Bundi under the control of Delhi. Bundi's last ruler signed the accession to the Indian Union on 7 April 1949.

Coat of arms
The coat of arms of Bundi was a shield depicting a warrior emerging from flames, signifying the creation-legend of the ruling Chouhan clan of Rajputs which was supposedly created from fire. The shield is flanked by cows representing dharma or righteousness; it is crowned by a hand holding a Katar.

Rulers
The rulers of Bundi State belonged to Hada Chauhan dynasty of Rajputs.

Rao Raja
 1554 - 1585  Surjan Singh
 1585 - 1608  Bhoj Singh
 1608 - 1632  Ratan Singh
 1632 - 1658  Chattar Sal Singh
 1658 - 1682  Bhao Singh
 1682 - 1696  Anirudh Singh
 1696 - 1730  Budh Singh                         (b. 16.. - d. 1739)
 1730 - 1749  Dalel Singh
 1749 - 1770  Umaid Singh (1st time)             (b. 1729 - d. 1804)
 1770 - 1773  Ajit Singh                         (d. 1773)
 1773 - 1804  Umaid Singh (2nd time)             (s.a.)
 1804 - 14 May 1821  Bishen Singh                       (b. 1773 - d. 1821)

Maharao Raja
 14 May 1821 - 28 Mar 1889  Ram Singh                          (b. 1811 - d. 1889)                            (from 1 Jan 1877, Sir Ram Singh)
 28 Mar 1889 - 26 Jul 1927 Raghubir Singh                     (b. 1869 - d. 1927)
(from 1 Jan 1894, Sir Raghubir Singh)
 26 Jul 1927 - 23 Apr 1945  Ishwari Singh                      (b. 1893 - d. 1945)                             (from 11 May 1937, Sir Ishwari Singh)
 23 Apr 1945 - 15 Aug 1947  Bahadur Singh                      (b. 1920 - d. 1977)

Titular Maharajdhiraja
 1947 – 1977  Bahadur Singh
 1977 - 2010    Ranjit singh Hada
 2012 -         Vanshvardhan Singh

See also

 Kota State
 Maratha Empire
 Rajputana
 History of Rajasthan

References

External links
 Silver Rupee of Bundi

Bundi district
Princely states of Rajasthan
1342 establishments in Asia
1949 disestablishments in India
14th-century establishments in India
States and territories established in 1342
Rajputs
Historical Hindu kingdoms
Rajput princely states